Elisabeth of Nuremberg (135826 July 1411) was Queen of Germany and Electress Palatine as the wife of Rupert, King of the Romans.

Life 
Elisabeth was born in 1358, the daughter of Frederick V, Burgrave of Nuremberg and his wife Elisabeth of Meissen, daughter of Frederick II, Margrave of Meissen.

In Amberg, on 27 June 1374, Elisabeth married Rupert, the son and heir of Rupert II, Elector Palatine. Upon Rupert's succession to the Palatinate in 1398, she became Electress consort of the Palatinate. When Rupert was elected King of the Romans in 1400, Elisabeth became Queen of the Romans. She survived her husband, who died on 18 May 1410, by a year, dying on 26 July 1411. Elisabeth was buried alongside her husband in the Church of the Holy Spirit, Heidelberg.

Issue 
 Rupert Pipan (20 February 1375, Amberg – 25 January 1397, Amberg)
 Margaret (1376 – 27 August 1434, Nancy), married on 6 February 1393 to Duke Charles II of Lorraine
 Frederick (c. 1377, Amberg – 7 March 1401, Amberg)
 Louis III, Elector Palatine (23 January 1378 – 30 December 1436, Heidelberg)
 Agnes (1379 – 1401, Heidelberg), married in Heidelberg shortly before March 1400 to Duke Adolph I of Cleves
 Elisabeth (27 October 1381 – 31 December 1408, Innsbruck), married in Innsbruck 24 December 1407 to Duke Frederick IV of Austria
 Count Palatine John of Neumarkt (1383, Neunburg vorm Wald – 13–14 March 1443)
 Count Palatine Stephen of Simmern-Zweibrücken (23 June 1385 – 14 February 1459, Simmern)
 Count Palatine Otto I of Mosbach (24 August 1390, Mosbach – 5 July 1461)

References

Sources

|-

|-

1358 births
1411 deaths
German queens consort
Electresses of the Palatinate
14th-century German women
14th-century German nobility
15th-century German women
15th-century German nobility
Daughters of monarchs